The seventh legislative assembly election to Tamil Nadu was held on 28 May 1980. The election was held two years before the end of the term of M. G. Ramachandran administration, as it was dissolved for the failure of state machinery by the then President of India Neelam Sanjiva Reddy. Dravida Munnetra Kazhagam allied with the Indian National Congress (Indira)  (this coalition has won more than 30 seats out of 40 in 1980 Lok sabha elections held months earlier) and All India Anna Dravida Munnetra Kazhagam with Janata Party. Despite their victory at the 1980 Lok Sabha polls, DMK and Indira Congress failed to win the legislative assembly election. AIADMK won the election and its leader and incumbent Chief Minister, M. G. Ramachandran was sworn in as Chief Minister for the second time.

Background 
The All India Anna Dravida Munnetra Kazhagam allied with Indian National Congress (Indira) in 1977 parliamentary election. However, when Janata Party won the election and Morarji Desai became the Prime Minister, M. G. Ramachandran extended unconditional support to the Janata party Government. He continued his support to the Charan Singh Government in 1979. After the fall of the Charan Singh government, fresh parliamentary elections were conducted in 1980. Dravida Munnetra Kazhagam struck alliance with INC(I). AIADMK and Janata Party alliance won only 2 seats in Tamil Nadu in that parliamentary election. INC(I) won the election and Indira Gandhi became the Prime Minister.

Dismissal of AIADMK government 
Congress-DMK victory in the 1980 parliamentary election emboldened their alliance and made them think that people lost their faith in M. G. Ramachandran government. DMK pressed the union government to dismiss the Tamil Nadu government using similar allegations used by M.G.R to dismiss DMK government in 1976. The AIADMK ministry and the assembly were dismissed by the union government on grounds of civil disorder due to Farmers protest for electricity subsidy. General elections were conducted in 1980.

Seat allotments
After the Lok Sabha election, negotiations in seat allotments between DMK and INC(I) were heated. They finally agreed on contesting in equal number of seats. This led to the debate on who the will be the Chief Minister if the alliance wins, which led to TNCC general secretary G.K. Moopanar and Prime Minister Indira Gandhi announcing that DMK president M. Karunanidhi will be the CM candidate for the alliance. Even after the announcement, party leaders were under the impression that DMK must outperform INC(I), in order for Karunanidhi to get the chief ministership.

AIADMK Front

DMK Front

Voting and Results

Results by Pre-Poll Alliance 

|-
! style="background-color:#E9E9E9;text-align:left;vertical-align:top;" |Alliance/Party
!style="width:4px" |
! style="background-color:#E9E9E9;text-align:right;" |Seats won
! style="background-color:#E9E9E9;text-align:right;" |Change
! style="background-color:#E9E9E9;text-align:right;" |Popular Vote
! style="background-color:#E9E9E9;text-align:right;" |Vote %
! style="background-color:#E9E9E9;text-align:right;" |Adj. %‡
|-
! style="background-color:#009900; color:white"|AIADMK+ alliance
! style="background-color: " | 
| 162
| +14
| 9,328,839
| colspan=2 style="text-align:center;vertical-align:middle;"| 48.9%
|-
|AIADMK
! style="background-color: #008000" |
| 129
| −1
| 7,303,010
| 38.8%
| 50.4%
|-
|CPI(M)
! style="background-color: #000080" |
| 11
| −1
| 596,406
| 3.2%
| 47.6%
|-
|CPI
! style="background-color: #0000FF" |
| 9
| +4
| 501,032
| 2.7%
| 43.9%
|-
|GKC
! style="background-color: teal" |
| 6
| +6
| 322,440
| 1.7%
| 44.1%
|-
|IND
! style="background-color: olive" |
| 6
| +6
| 488,296
| 2.6%
| 
|-
|FBL
! style="background-color: #800000" |
| 1
| –
| 65,536
| 0.4%
| 44.6%
|-
|INC(U)
! style="background-color:" |
| 0
| –
| 52,119
| 0.3%
| 29.3%
|-
! style="background-color:#FF0000; color:white"|DMK+ alliance
! style="background-color: " |
| 69
| −6
| 8,371,718
| colspan=2 style="text-align:center;vertical-align:middle;"| 44.4%
|-
|DMK
! style="background-color: #FF0000" |
| 37
| −11
| 4,164,389
| 22.1%
| 45.7%
|-
|INC(I)
! style="background-color: #00FFFF" |
| 31
| +4
| 3,941,900
| 20.9%
| 43.4%
|-
|IND
! style="background-color: lime" |
| 1
| +1
| 265,429
| 1.4%
| 
|-
! style="background-color:gray; color:white"|Others
! style="background-color:gray" |
| 3
| −8
| 1,144,449
| colspan=2 style="text-align:center;vertical-align:middle;"| 6.1%
|-
|JNP(JP)
! style="background-color: #FFFF00" |
| 2
| −8
| 522,641
| 2.8%
| 6.9%
|-
|IND
! style="background-color: #666666" |
| 1
| –
| 598,897
| 3.2%
| –
|-
| style="text-align:center;" |Total
! style="background-color: " |
| 234
| –
| 18,845,006
| 100%
| –
|-
|}
‡: Vote % reflects the percentage of votes the party received compared to the entire electorate that voted in this election. Adjusted (Adj.) Vote %, reflects the % of votes the party received per constituency that they contested.
Sources: Election Commission of India and Keesing's Report

By constituency

M.G.R's Second Cabinet
After the Seventh General Elections held in 1980, a new Ministry with Dr. M. G. Ramachandran as Chief Ministers was formed on the noon of 9 June 1980. The names of
the Ministers with their portfolios are given below: 

Thiruvalargal S.R. Eradha and M.R. Govendan and Selvi P. Vijayalakhsmi were
appointed as additional Members of the Council of Ministers with effect from 1 July 1983.
Consequently the business of the Government was re-allocated among the Ministers as follows
with effect from 1 July 1983:

 Thiru M. G. Ramachandran, Chief Minister-Minister in-charge of Public, General Administration, Indian administrative Service, District Revenue Officers, Deputy Collectors, Police, Prevention of corruption, Planning Molasses and Archaeology.
 Thiru (Dr.). V. R. Nedunchezhiyan, Minister for Finance-Minister-in-charge of Finance, Legislature, Elections, Food, Youth Service Corps, Price Control and exservicemen.
 Thiru S. Ramachandran, Minister for Electricity-Minister-in-charge of Electricity, Iron and Steel control.
 Thiru K. A. Krishnasamy, Minister for Rural Industries-Minister-in-charge of Rural Industries including Village, Cottage and small Industries, Milk Dairy development, Registration and Stamp Act.
 Thiru S. D. Somasundaram, Minister for Revenue-Minister-in-charge of Revenue, Commercial Taxes, Excise and Census.
 Thiru R. M. Veerappan, Minister for Information and Religious Endowments Minister-in-charge of Information and Publicity, Film Technology, Tourism, Tourism Development corporation, Cinchona and Grant of Liquor Permits.
 Thiru C. Arangayagam, Minister for Education-Minister-in-charge of Education including Technical education, Official Language and Handlooms.
 Thiru K. Kalimuthu, Minister for Agriculture-Minister-in-charge of Agriculture, Agricultural Refinance, Agricultural Engineering Wing and Agro-Engineering
 Thiru C. Ponnaiyan, Minister for Co-operation and Law-Minister-in-charge of Law, Courts, Prisons, Legislation on Weights and Measures, Registration of companies, Debt Relief including Legislation on Money Lending and Legislation on Chits and Co-operation.
 Thiru P. Kulandaivelu, Minister for Local Administration-Minister-in-charge of Municipal Administration, Panchayats, and Panchayat Unions, Community Development, Rural Indebtedness Bhoodan and Gramdhan and Highways.
 Thiru S. Raghavanandham, Minister for Labour-Minister-in-charge of Labour, Housing, slum-clearance Board, Statistics, Tamil Nadu water Supply and Drainage Board, Town Planning and Accommodation Control
 Thiru (Dr.) H. V. Hande, Minister for Health-Minister-in-charge of Health.
 Thiru K. Raja Mohammed, Minister for Irrigation-Minister-in-charge of AgroService, Co-operative Societies, Irrigation including Minor Irrigation and Wakf.
 Thiru S. Muthusamy, Minister for transport-Minister-in-charge of Transport, Nationalised Transport, Motor Vehicles Act and Ports.
 Thiru S. Thirunavukkarasu, Minister for Industries-Minister-in-charge of Large Scale Industries, Mines and Minerals and Textiles.
 Thiru S. N. Rajendran, Minister for Public works-Minister-in-charge of Prohibition excluding grant of liquor permits, Passports, P.W.D. and Establishment matters relating to public Works Department.
 Thiru M. Vijayasarathi, Minister for Adi-Dravidar Welfare-Minister-in-charge of Adi-Dravidar Welfare, Stationery and Printing, Government Press, News Print control, Hilo Tribes and Bonded Labour and Employment Training.
 Thiru S. R. Eradha, Minister for Fisheries-Minister-in-charge of Fisheries.
 Thiru M. R. Govendan, Minister for Backward Classes: Minister-in-charge of Backward Classes.
 Thirumathi Gomathi Sainivasan, Minister for Social Welfare: Minister-in charge of Social welfare including women and Children welfare, Animal Husbandry, Beggars Home, Orphanages, Indian Overseas, Refugees and Evacuees and Correctional Administration.
 Selvi P. Vijayalakshmi, Minister for Khadi-Minister-in-charge of Khadi. Thiru K. Raja Mohammed ceased to be a Member of the Council of Ministers and Tvl.
R. Soundararajan, Y. S. M. Yusuf, R Arunachalam and K.Kalaimani were appointed as additional Members of the Council of Minister with effect from 9 September 1983. Consequently the business of the Government was re-allocated among the Ministers as follows with effect from 9 September 1983:

 Thiru (Dr). M. G. Ramachandran, Chief Minister-Minister-in-charge of Public, General Administration, Indian Administrative Service and Other All India Services, District Revenue Officers, Deputy Collectors, Police, Prevention of Corruption, Planning, Molasses, Archaeology and Excise.
 Thiru (Dr). V. R. Nedunchezhiyan, Minister for Finance-Minister-in-charge of Finance. Legislature, Election, Food, Youth Service Corps, Price Control and Ex-servicemen.
 Thiru S. Ramafhandran, Minister for Electricity-Minister-in-charge of Electricity, Iron and Steel Control. 
 Thiru K. A. Krishnaswamy, Minister for Dairy Development-Minister-in-charge of Milk, Dairy Development, Registration and Stamp Act.
 Thiru S. D. Somasundaran, Minister for Revenue. Minister-in-charge of Revenue, Commercial Taxes and Census.
 Thiru R. M. Veerappan, Minister for Information and Religious Endowments. Minister-in-charge of Information and Publicity Film Technology, Tourism, Tourism Development Corporation, Cinematograph Act, Hindu Religious and Charitable Endowments, Forest, Cinchona and Grant of Liquor Permits.
 Thiru C. Aranganayagam, Minister for Education: Minister-in-charge of Education Including Technical Education Official Language, and Handlooms. 
 Thiru K. Kalimuhth, Minister for Agriculture: Ministers in Charge of Agriculture, Agricultural Refinance, Agricultural Engineering Wing and Agro Engineering.
 Thiru C. Ponnaiyan, Minister for Co-operation and Law: Ministers in Charge of Law, Courts Prisons, Legislation on Weights and Measures, Registration of Companies, Debt Relief Including Legislation on Money Lending and Legislation on Chits and Co-operation.
 Thiru P. Kulandaivelu, Minister for Local Administration: Minister in Charge of Municipal Administration, Panchayats and Panchayat Union, Community Development, Rural Indebtedness, Bhodhan and Gramphan and Highway.
 Thiru S. Raghavanandham, Minister for Labour: Minister in Charge of Labour, Housing, Slum Clearance Board, Statistics, Tamil Nadu Water Supply and Drainage Board, Town Planning and Accommodation Control:
 Thiru (Dr.) H. V. Hande, Minister for Health: Minister in Charge of Health.
 Thiru S. Muhtusamy, Minister for Transport: Minister in Charge of Transport, Nationalised Transport Motor Vehicles Act and Ports.
 Thiru S. Thirunavukkarasu, Minister for Industries: Minister in Charge of Large Scale Industries Mines and Minerals and Textiles.
 Thiru S. N. Rajendran, Minister for Public Works: Minister in charge of Prohibition excluding grant of Liquor permits, Passports, P.W.D. and Establishment matters relating to Public Works Department.
 Thiru M. Vijayasarathi, Minister for Adi-dravidar Welfare. Minister in Charge of Adi-dravidar Welfare, Stationery and Printing, Government Press, News Print Control, Hill Tribes and Bonded Labour and Employment Training.
 Thiru R. Soundararajan, Minister for Nutritious Meals: Minister in Charge of Nutritious Meals.
 Thiru S. R. Eradha, Minister for Environmental Pollution Control. Minister in Charge of Environmental Pollution Control.
 Thiru M. R. Govendan, Minister for Backward Classes. Minister in Charge of Backward Classes.
 Thirumathi Gomathi Srinivasan, Minister for Social Welfare. Minister in Charge of Social Welfare Including Women and Children Welfare, Animal Husbandry, Beggars Home, Orphanages, Indian Overseas, Refugees and Evacuees and Correctional Administration.
 Thirumathi Vijayalakshmi Palanisamy, Minister for Khadi. Minister in Charge of Khadi.
 Thiru Y. S. M. Yusuf, Minister for Irrigation and Wakf. Minister in Charge of Agro Services Co-operative Societies, Irrigation Including Minor Irrigation and Wakf.
 Thiru R. Arunachalam, Minister for Rural Industries-Minister in Charge of Rural Industries Including Village, Cottage and Small Industries.
 Thiru K. Kalaimani, Minister for Fisheries. Minister in Charge of Fisheries.

Thiruvalargal T. Veerasamy and K.K.S.S.R. Ramachandran were appointed as
additional Members of the Council of Ministers with effect from 5 September 1984. The
business of the Government was re-allocated among the Ministers as follows with effect from
5 September 1984.

 Thiru (Dr.) M. G. Ramachandran Chief Minister, Minister in Charge of Public, General Administration, Indian Administrative Service and Other All India Services, District Revenue Officers, Deputy Collectors, Police, Prevention of Corruption, Planning,  Molasses Archaeology, Prohibition Excluding Grant of Liquor Permits, Electronics, Science and Technology.
 Thiru (Dr.) V. R. Nedunchezhiyan, Minister for Finance. Minister in Charge of Finance, Revenue, Legislature, Elections, Youth Service Corps, and Ex-servicemen.
 Thiru S. Ramachandran, Minister for Electricity. Minister in Charge of Electricity, Iron and Steel Control.
 Thiru K. A. Krishnasamy, Minister for Dairy Development. Minister in Charge of Milk, Dairy Development, Registration and Stamp Act.
 Thiru R. M. Veerappan, Minister for Information and Religious Endowments. Minister in Charge of Information and Publicity, Film Technology, Tourism, Tourism Development Corporation, Cinematograph Act, Hindu Religious and Charitable Endowments, Forest, Cinchona and Grant of Liquor Permits.
 Thiru C. Aranganayagam, Minister for Education. Minister in Charge of Education and Official Language.
 Thiru (Dr.) K. Kalimuthu, Minister for Agriculture. Minister in Charge of Agriculture, Agricultural Refinance, Agricultural Engineering Wing and Agro-engineering.
 Thiru C. Ponnaiyan, Minister for Law and Industries. Minister in Charge of Law, Courts, Prisons, Legislation on Weights and Measures, Registration of Companies, Debt Relief Including Legislation on Money Lending and Legislation on Chits, Large Scale Industries, Mines and Minerals.
 Thiru P. Kulandaivelu, Minister for Nutritious Meals-Minister in Charge of Nutritious Meals, Bhoodan and Gramdhan and Highways.
 Thiru S. Raghavanandham, Minister for Labour-Minister in Charge of Labour, Statistics, Tamil Nadu Water Supply and Drainage Board, Town Planning and Accommodation Control.
 Thiru (Dr.) H. V. Hande, Minister for Health. Minister in Charge of Health.
 Thiru S. Muthusamy, Minister for Transport-Minister in Charge of Transport, Nationalised Transport, Motor Vehicles Act and Ports.
 Thiru S. Thirunavukkarasu, Minister for Commercial Taxes and Handloomsminister in Charge of Commercial Taxes, Excise, Handlooms and Textiles.
 Thiru S. Rajendran, Minister for Environmental Pollution Control-Minister in Charge of Environmental Pollution Control and Passport.
 Thiru M. Vijayasarathi, Minister for Adi-drav9dar Welfare-Minister in Charge of Adi-dravidar Welfare, Stationery and Printing, Government Press, News Print Control, Hill Tribes and Bonded Labour and Employment Training.
 Thiru R. Soundararajan, Minister for Local Administration-Minister in Charge of Municipal Administration, Panchayats and Panchayat Unions, Community Development And\ Rural Indebtedness.
 Thiru S. R. Eradha, Minister for Public Works-Minister in Charge of Housing, Slum Clearance Board, Public Works Department and Establishment Matters Relating to Public Works Department.
 Thiru M. R. Govendan, Minister for Backward Classes-Minister in Charge of Backward Classes.
 Thirmathi Gomathi Srinivasan, Minister for Social Welfare-Minister in Charge of Social Welfare Including Women and Children Welfare, Animal Husbandry, Beggars Home, Orphanages, Indians Overseas, Refugees and Evacuees and Correctional Administration.
 Thirumathi Vijayalakshmi Palanisamy, Minister for Khadi-Minister in Charge of Khadi.
 Thiru Y. S. M. Yusuf, Minister for Irrigation and Wakf-Minister in Charge of Agro Service Co-operative Societies, Irrigation Including Minor Irrigation and Wakf.
 Thiru R. Arunachalam, Minister for Rural Industries-Minister in Charge of Rural Industries Including Village, Cottage and Small Industries.
 Thiru K. Kalaimani, Minister for Fisheries-Minister in Charge of Fisheries.
 Thiru T. Veeraswamy, Minister for Food-Minister in Charge of Food, Price Control and Census.
 Thiru K. K. S. S. R. Ramachandran, Minister for Co-operation-Minister in Charge of Co-operation.

See also 
Elections in Tamil Nadu
Legislature of Tamil Nadu
Government of Tamil Nadu

Footnotes

External links
 Election Commission of India

1980
1980s in Tamil Nadu
1980 State Assembly elections in India